Cheetham may refer to:

People
 Cheetham (surname)

Places
 Cheetham and Altona Important Bird Area, Melbourne, Australia
 Cheetham Close, a megalith and scheduled ancient monument located in Lancashire, very close to the boundary with Greater Manchester
 Cheetham Hill, a suburban area of the city of Manchester, England
 Cheetham Ice Tongue, a small ice tongue on the east coast of Victoria Land region of Antarctica
 Cape Cheetham, an ice-covered cape forming the northeast extremity of Stuhlinger Ice Piedmont in the Victoria Land region of Antarctica
 Manchester Cheetham (UK Parliament constituency), a parliamentary constituency in the city of Manchester

See also
 Cheatham (disambiguation)